The Front of Communist Youth (FGC) is a Marxist–Leninist youth organization founded in 2012. It defines itself as "a revolutionary organization of young workers, students, and workless youth that struggles against capitalism, to build a socialist society". The FGC consisted of around 1,500 members as of 2020 and participates in student elections and political actions across Italy.

The FGC assumes a revolutionary program and bases its ideology on Marxism–Leninism. It aims to abolish capitalism and to transform Italy into a socialist state. It draws inspiration from real socialism, particularly the Soviet Union before Khrushchev. The FGC also claims the necessity for Italy of a unilateral exit from EU and NATO.

In 2015, the FGC became a member of the World Federation of Democratic Youth.

On March 12, 2020, the Front of Communist Youth split from Italy's Communist Party, of which it had been affiliated since 2016. The FGC accused Marco Rizzo, the Party's General Secretary, of "individualism" and "opportunism", and left due to organizational and political differences.

References

External links
 Official site
 Senza Tregua – official site

Youth wings of political parties in Italy
Youth wings of communist parties